Stalking Pete Doherty is a rockumentary assembled from footage shot by filmmaker Max Carlish. As the title suggests, it is about both attempts by Carlish to interview Pete Doherty.

Filmmaker
Carlish is a British documentary filmmaker and former lecturer in media studies, born to Jewish parents in the city of Birmingham. Carlish helped produce an Emmy and BAFTA-award-winning television series about the Royal Opera House. He is most famous, however, for his attempts to produce a so-called rockumentary about Pete Doherty, singer and guitarist with The Libertines and Babyshambles. Doherty was charged with assault and blackmail of the filmmaker after Carlish sold photographs of Doherty taking heroin to Sunday newspapers.

Release and reception
Carlish's footage was used in a programme entitled Stalking Pete Doherty broadcast on 17 May 2005, and then again on 11 March 2006 on Channel 4. In fact, the programme focused more on Carlish's apparent obsession with Doherty than it did with Doherty's life.

"A friend of mine saw the footage of him taking heroin and thought I could sell them," Carlish commented. "Before I knew it I was in the middle of a bidding war. I was desperate for money and by this point I had convinced myself I would never see Pete again, would never be able to complete my film."

The film was never finished. Stalking Pete Doherty was produced by North One Television, who, in the words of one critic, "recognised that it was Carlish's struggle and failure to make his film that was the real story". Doherty reportedly attempted to halt the broadcast by Channel 4, on the basis that the footage taken by Carlish was in fact owned by his management company.

Personal life
Carlish was educated at King David Primary School and then King Edward's School, Birmingham where he was a keen amateur dramatist – writing and performing a "hip-hop opera" in which Carlish "rapped" about a mystical "Rock of Crack" (Cocaine) and where at least one contemporary remembers him as energetically outspoken even at a young age. He would later attend the prestigious American prep school The Hotchkiss School in Lakeville, Connecticut. Carlish was known to socialise with students, even taking drugs with some of them on more than a number of occasions. This element of his lifestyle was briefly touched upon in the Stalking Pete Doherty documentary.

Aftermath
Carlish subsequently worked as planning manager for Great City Attractions, a Ferris wheel operator which collapsed in 2012.

References

 Quote from interview in Stalking Pete Doherty

External links
 
 The life of a Libertine, Max Carlish, The Guardian, 25 February 2005
 Doherty arrested after 'assault', BBC News, 3 February 2005
Fat and poor, Max Carlish, The Idler, 1999
Max Carlish's story changes, thebadrash.com
Max Carlish in Pete in Kate on Channel 4, thebadrash.com

Documentary films about singers